1984 United States Grand Prix may refer to:

1984 Dallas Grand Prix
1984 Detroit Grand Prix